Julie Coin and Ana Vrljić were the defending champions, having won the event in 2013, however Vrljić chose to participate at Tampico instead, whilst Coin chose not to participate.

Stéphanie Foretz and Amandine Hesse won the title, defeating Alberta Brianti and Maria Elena Camerin in the final by a default.

Seeds

Draw

References 
 Draw

Open GDF Suez de Touraine - Doubles